The Loreto Schools are a group of all-girl Roman Catholic schools throughout the world associated with the Sisters of Loreto and run by Loreto Educational Society (Loreto sisters), which in India runs 17 schools and 2 colleges. They originated in Ireland in the 1850s so as to combat the growing Protestant influence in English education in the then British-controlled Ireland. Its chief purpose was to ensure Catholic education for Irish Catholic girls. It spread to India and Australia in the 1870s.

Loreto Schools in India

In Kolkata, India, Loreto schools are located at 7 Middleton Row (Loreto House - the largest of the group), Sealdah, Entally, Bowbazar, Elliot Road and Dharmatala. Loreto Day School Sealdah
There are Loreto schools in other cities across India including Darjeeling, Delhi, Lucknow (having two) and Asansol. The schools engage in charitable activities and on academic and all-round development of the students.
Loreto Convent, Asansol
Loreto Convent Doranda, Ranchi
Loreto Convent Lucknow, established 1872
St. Agnes' Loreto Day School,Lucknow
Loreto Convent, Tara Hall, Shimla, established 1892
Loreto Convent, Darjeeling, established 1846
Loreto Convent, Shillong
Loreto Convent, Delhi

See also
 List of Loreto Colleges and schools
 Education in Kolkata

References

Kolkata
Catholic schools in India
Christian schools in West Bengal
Girls' schools in Kolkata
1970s establishments in India